José de Almeida Neto, known as Telefone, (born 21 July 1901, date of death unknown) was a Brazilian footballer. He played in five matches for the Brazil national football team in 1920 and 1921. He was also part of Brazil's squad for the 1920 South American Championship.

References

External links
 

1901 births
Year of death missing
Brazilian footballers
Brazil international footballers
Place of birth missing
Association footballers not categorized by position